The 1999 NCAA Division I Women's Tennis Championships were the 18th annual championships to determine the national champions of NCAA Division I women's singles, doubles, and team collegiate tennis in the United States.

Stanford defeated hosts, and defending champions, Florida in the team final, 5–2, to claim their tenth national title.

Host
This year's tournaments were hosted by the University of Florida at the Linder Stadium in Gainesville, Florida.

The men's and women's NCAA tennis championships would not be held jointly until 2006.

See also
NCAA Division II Tennis Championships (Men, Women)
NCAA Division III Tennis Championships (Men, Women)

References

External links
List of NCAA Women's Tennis Champions

NCAA Division I tennis championships
NCAA Division I Women's Tennis Championships
NCAA Division I Women's Tennis Championships
NCAA Division I Women's Tennis Championships